The Act III: M.O.T.T.E 'Moment of Truth The End' World Tour (referred to as Act III: M.O.T.T.E) was the second concert tour by South Korean rapper and singer-songwriter G-Dragon. It was in support of his self-titled EP Kwon Ji Yong (2017). The tour began on June 10, 2017 in Seoul and concluded on October 8, 2017 in Taipei, Taiwan.

Act III represents the beginning of the third decade of his life while 'M.O.T.T.E' meaning "mother's womb" in Korean, or "from birth", also serves as an acronym for 'Moment Of Truth The End'. The tour is the largest concert tour ever conducted by a Korean solo artist, it was attended by 654,000 people worldwide.

Background
In January 2017, YG Entertainment announced that G-Dragon was working on a new solo album to be released in 2017, along with a new concert tour to support the album. On March 31, it was reported by various media outlets that G-Dragon will perform at Seoul World Cup Stadium on June 10. YG Entertainment confirmed the concert a week later, making G-Dragon the second solo artist in history to perform at Seoul World Cup Stadium, after labelmate PSY. On April 25, it was announced that the tour would visit 18 cities across Asia, North America and Oceania. On June 17, additional dates were announced in Hong Kong, Philippines, Indonesia, Malaysia and Taiwan. On June 26, YG Entertainment added five European cities to the tour, marking the first time for G-Dragon to stage a solo performance in Europe.

The concert at Seoul World Cup Stadium was live-streamed in Japanese cinemas. The final concert in Japan at Tokyo Dome on September 20 was aired live in 100 theaters across Japan.

Renowned designer and director Willo Perron, served as the creative director for the tour, having previously worked with international artists such as Rihanna, Kanye West, and Drake.

Commercial performance
Ticket sales started in South Korea on April 13, and all 40,000 tickets were sold out in 8 minutes, and generated $3.9 million USD in revenue from tickets sales. In Macau, a second show was added after the first sold-out moments after release, selling a combined number of 22,000 tickets. In Hong Kong, G-Dragon broke the record for the highest attendance at AsiaWorld–Arena for a single show, gathering 18,200 concertgoers each night for two consecutive performances. G-Dragon's tour in Japan gathered a combined audience of 260,000 for five concerts, with attendance per concert averaging 52,000 people.

The tour listed on Pollstars year end list, on the Top 200 North American Tours, G-Dragon ranked at number 154 and earned $7.9 million from eight shows, making him the second Korean artist to enter the chart, after his band Big Bang.

Critical reception

The tour received positive reviews from music critics. Writing about the concert in Macau, Kimberly Lim from The New Paper felt that "idea behind the concert was simple, yet profound." Lim also complimented how G-Dragon "has proven himself to be a multifaceted performer – one who is able to rap lighthearted, energetic songs, and sing emotional, power ballads while dancing."

Riddhi Chakraborty, a reporter from Rolling Stone India described the first part of the concert as an "energetic opening" that starts with "pop-soaked hits from early on in his career, setting up a chronological progression of his repertoire for the rest of the evening", while the second part presents the "creation of a superstar depicted as a painful, surgical process, serving as a commentary on the superficiality of the entertainment industry", with G-Dragon jumping "genres effortlessly" and "wrapping it all up neatly with sharp choreography." About the final part, she wrote that it was "easily the most intimate of the three segments", and concluded that in the concert, the rapper decided "lay it all bare and give his fans the best show possible", making use of "precise choreography, stage direction, seamless costume changes and a plethora of pyrotechnics", but despite its "high production value", the writer felt that his "unwavering enthusiasm, electric stage presence and brutal honesty that indeed make it 'the tour you cannot miss.'"

The website Vulture ranked the concert at the Barclays Center at number three in their "The 10 Best Concerts of 2017" list, complementing how he "performed with presence, aware that he's not just any man, putting on a show in three acts that saw multiple wardrobe changes, sharp choreography, expensive lights and sets onstage, and his usual cheeky oscillations between femme and machismo." Additionally, they praised the way the rapper "broke the fourth wall" and showed the audience that "he's still a work in progress, but he's no longer scared to let his fans watch that transformation."

Set list
This set list is representative of the show on June 17, 2017 in Macau. It is not representative of all concerts for the duration of the tour.Act I "Heartbreaker"
 "Breathe"
 "A Boy"
 "But I Love U"
 "Obsession"Act II "MichiGO"
 "One of a Kind"
 "R.O.D"
 "That XX"
 "Black"
 "Missing You" 
 "You Do"
 "Who You"
 "I Love It"
 "Today"
 "Crayon"Act III "Super Star"
 "Middle Fingers Up"
 "Bullshit"
 "Divina Commedia"
 "This Love"
 "Crooked"
 "Untitled, 2014"

Tour dates

Personnel
Credits adapted from the video credits shown at the end of the show.Band Gil Smith II – Music director/keyboard
 Toure Harris – Pro Tools
 Omar Dominick – Bass
 Bennie Rodgers II – Drums 
 Justin Lyons – GuitarDancersHi-Tec
 Park Jung Heon
 Kim Byung Gon
 Kwon Young Deuk
 Kwon Young Don
 Lee Young Sang
 You Chung Jae
Crazy
 Won Ah Yeon
 Park Eun Young
 Kim Min Jung
 Kim Hee Yeon
 Park Eun Chong
 Mai MurakawaConcert Lee Jae Wook – Choreographer
 Jeong Chi Young - Executive Director
 Lee Rachel - Concert Director
 Gee Eun – Visual director/stylistPersonal services'
 Choi Hong Il – Manager
 Lee Tae Hee – Manager
 Kim Tae Hyun – Hair stylist
 Lim Hea Kyung – Make-up stylist
 Kim Yun Kyoung – Make-up stylist
 Shin Mi Sug – Make-up stylist
 Hwangssabu – Personal trainer
 Lee Ji Hyun – Personal trainer
 Choi Jae Ho – Security
 Yang Soon Chul – Security

Notes

References

External links
Official Site
YG Entertainment
Big Bang Japan Official Site

2017 concert tours
BigBang (South Korean band) concert tours
G-Dragon
Concert tours of North America
Concert tours of the United States
Concert tours of Canada
Concert tours of Europe
Concert tours of the United Kingdom
Concert tours of France
Concert tours of Germany
Concert tours of Oceania
Concert tours of Australia
Concert tours of New Zealand
Concert tours of Asia
Concert tours of Japan